Normand Krumpschmid (born 13 December 1969) is a Canadian-born Austrian ice hockey player. He competed in the men's tournament at the 1998 Winter Olympics.

Career statistics

Regular season and playoffs

International

References

External links
 

1969 births
Living people
Austrian ice hockey players
Olympic ice hockey players of Austria
Ice hockey people from Ontario
Ice hockey players at the 1998 Winter Olympics
National Hockey League supplemental draft picks
Sportspeople from Greater Sudbury
Vancouver Canucks draft picks